The Ocean Township School District (formally known as the Township of Ocean School District) is a comprehensive community public school district serving students in pre-kindergarten through twelfth grade from Ocean Township, in Monmouth County, New Jersey, United States.

As of the 2018–19 school year, the district, comprising five schools, had an enrollment of 3,458 students and 356.2 classroom teachers (on an FTE basis), for a student–teacher ratio of 9.7:1.

The district is classified by the New Jersey Department of Education as being in District Factor Group "FG", the fourth-highest of eight groupings. District Factor Groups organize districts statewide to allow comparison by common socioeconomic characteristics of the local districts. From lowest socioeconomic status to highest, the categories are A, B, CD, DE, FG, GH, I and J.

History
In 1834, land was purchased by the trustees of the Deal School District and a two-room schoolhouse was built. It served the students until 1885 when the school had 156 students and a larger building was needed. (This school is currently located on Monmouth Road, Oakhurst)

The Poplar Road School, since demolished, was located between Deal Road and West Park Avenue in the Poplar section of town, this school was used from 1864 until 1911 when the students were sent to the new Oakhurst School.

The first Wayside School was located on the Tinton Falls side of Hope Road it was used until 1911, when pupils were sent to the new Oakhurst School, at this time however all high school students traveled to Long Branch High School by stagecoach.

The Oakhurst School was built in 1900. It accommodated all students from Wayside and Oakhurst in grades one to eight from 1900 until 1958. From 1959 to 1975, it was used as a K-4 and K-5 facility. Principals included Ralph Busch, Charles J. Strahan, Frank Parker, Jesse Love, Harry Patterson, Estelle Voorhees, Ernest Smith, Richard Randall, John D.W. Rasp, Donald Vineburg, and Glen Morgan. Since 1975, the building has been used as the school district's administrative offices.

The Wanamassa School, opened in 1930 to serve all students in Wanamassa. Before that, students walked to the Bradley School in Asbury Park. The school is still used to this day for grades PK-4 and Special Education Disabilities Classes. Principals included Victoria Green, Edward German, J. Anthony Covino, Joseph Palaia, Douglas Deicke, Camille Tighe, Margaret Grilli, Justine Salvo, and current Victor Milano.

The Ocean Township Elementary School on Dow Avenue opened in 1958 as a middle school, serving grades five to eight. Upper-grade teachers from Wanamassa and Oakhurst Schools moved to the new school with their principal J. Anthony Covino. In 1984, Cavino retired and Mrs. Villapiano, Assistant Principal, took over. At her retirement in 2002, William Galatro took over and served until 2007. Dr. Doreen O. Ryan is currently Principal. The school currently housed Grades PK-4 and Special Education Disabilities Classes.

The Wayside Elementary School opened on January 5, 1970. It houses grades PK-4. John D.W. Rasp was the first principal until 1988. Other principals have included Douglas Deicke, Thomas Pagano, David Enderly, and currently Denise Palaia.

Before the Ocean Township High School opened in 1965, students from the district were bused to Long Branch High School or Asbury Park High School. The principals were Charles Scott, Douglas Fredricks, Robert Mahon, Gardner Atlee, John Crews, John Connelly, John Tighe, Margaret Morgan, John Lysko, Dr. William Cohee, Julia Davidow, and currently Kelly E. Weldon. Under Miss Weldon serve Gina Hagerman, Grades 10-12 Assistant Principal and Michael Lambusta, Grades 9-11 Assistant Principal.

The Township of Ocean Intermediate School was opened in 1975 to house grades seven, eight, and nine. It now houses grades five, six, seven, and eight.

In April 2017, more than 95% of Loch Arbour voters participating in a referendum chose to leave the Ocean Township district and to begin sending students for elementary school to the West Long Branch Public Schools and then move on to attend Shore Regional High School, under the terms of sending/receiving relationships with the two districts by which Loch Arbour would be charged on a per-pupil basis. The average cost to Loch Arbour taxpayers of educating students in the sending districts would be $16,000 per student, a significant drop from the $126,000 was paying in property taxes per student under its relationship as part of the Ocean Township School District.

Laramie Project controversy
In August, 2007 the high school received international attention when its principal, Julia Davidow, backed by superintendent of schools Thomas Pagano decided to prohibit West Park Players, the school's drama club, from staging the play The Laramie Project. The play, an account of the 1998 murder of gay Wyoming student Matthew Shepard, had a pro-LGBT and pro-tolerance message that the two administrators felt would offend conservative community values, Davidow stating "I do not want to draw a line between those who think homosexuality is right and those who think it is wrong.  I have a school community to run here and I must protect everyone involved." In the wake of widespread outrage at Pagano's and Davidow's act and calls for their disciplining, the play was reinstated.

Schools
Schools in the district (with 2018–19 enrollment data from the National Center for Education Statistics) are:

Elementary schools
Ocean Township Elementary School (located in Oakhurst; with 403 students, in grades PreK-4)
Melissa Lopusznick, Principal
Wanamassa Elementary School (Wanamassa; 304, K-4)
Victor R. Milano, Principal
Wayside Elementary School (Wayside; 566, PreK-4)
Denise T. Palaia - Principal
Middle school
Ocean Township Intermediate School (Wayside; 1,067, 5-8)
Christopher Amato, Principal
High school
Ocean Township High School (Oakhurst; 1,070, 9-12)
Dawn Kaszuba, Principal

Special education
The district provides a Free Appropriate Public Education for all students with disabilities between the ages of 3 and 21 in the least restrictive environment. All children 3 through 21, who reside in the Township of Ocean School District are provided with access to some kind of special education.

Administration
Core members of the district's administration are:
Dr. James Stefankiewicz, Superintendent
Tina Trueba, Business Administrator / Board Secretary

Board of education
The district's board of education, with nine members, sets policy and oversees the fiscal and educational operation of the district through its administration. As a Type II school district, the board's trustees are elected directly by voters to serve three-year terms of office on a staggered basis, with three seats up for election each year held (since 2012) as part of the November general election. The board appoints a superintendent to oversee the district's day-to-day operations and a business administrator to supervise the business functions of the district.

References

External links
Township of Ocean Schools

School Data for the Ocean Township School District, National Center for Education Statistics

Ocean Township, Monmouth County, New Jersey
New Jersey District Factor Group FG
School districts in Monmouth County, New Jersey